R. dentata may refer to:
 Rhus dentata, the nana berry, a plant species found in South Africa
 Roridula dentata, a protocarnivorous plant species native to South Africa

See also
 Dentata (disambiguation)